A right circular cylinder is a cylinder whose generatrices are perpendicular to the bases. Thus, in a right circular cylinder, the generatrix and the height have the same measurements. It is also less often called a cylinder of revolution, because it can be obtained by rotating a rectangle of sides  and  around one of its sides.

In addition to the right circular cylinder, within the study of spatial geometry there is also the oblique circular cylinder, characterized by not having the geratrices perpendicular to the bases.

Examples of objects that are shaped like a right circular cylinder are: some cans and candles.

Elements of the right circular cylinder 
Bases: the two parallel and congruent circles of the bases;

Axis: the line determined by the two points of the centers of the cylinder's bases;

Height: the distance between the two planes of the cylinder's bases;

Geratrices: the line segments parallel to the axis and that have ends at the points of the bases' circles.

Lateral and total areas 

The lateral surface of a right cylinder is the meeting of the generatrices. It can be obtained by the product between the length of the circumference of the base and the height of the cylinder. Therefore, the lateral surface area is given by:

 .

Where:

 represents the lateral surface area of the cylinder;
 is approximately 3.14;
 is the distance between the lateral surface of the cylinder and the axis, i.e. it is the value of the radius of the base;
 is the height of the cylinder;
  is the length of the circumference of the base, since , that is, .
Note that in the case of the right circular cylinder, the height and the generatrix have the same measure, so the lateral area can also be given by:
 .
The area of the base of a cylinder is the area of a circle (in this case we define that the circle has a radius with measure ):
 .

To calculate the total area of a right circular cylinder, you simply add the lateral area to the area of the two bases:

 .

  

or even

 .

Volume 

Through Cavalieri's principle, which defines that if two solids of the same height, with congruent base areas, are positioned on the same plane, such that any other plane parallel to this plane sections both solids, determining from this section two polygons with the same area, then the volume of the two solids will be the same, we can determine the volume of the cylinder.

This is because the volume of a cylinder can be obtained in the same way as the volume of a prism with the same height and the same area of the base. Therefore, simply multiply the area of the base by the height:

 .

Since the area of a circle of radius , which is the base of the cylinder, is given by  it follows that:

 

or even

 .

Equilateral cylinder 

The equilateral cylinder is characterized by being a right circular cylinder in which the diameter of the base is equal to the value of the height (geratrix).

Its lateral area can be obtained by replacing the height value by :

  .

The result can be obtained in a similar way for the total area:

    .

For the equilateral cylinder it is possible to obtain a simpler formula to calculate the volume. Simply substitute the radius and height measurements defined earlier into the volume formula for a straight circular cylinder:

Meridian section 
It is the intersection between a plane containing the axis of the cylinder and the cylinder.

In the case of the right circular cylinder, the meridian section is a rectangle, because the generatrix is perpendicular to the base. The equilateral cylinder, on the other hand, has a square meridian section because its height is congruent to the diameter of the base.

Examples of objects with a right circular cylinder shape

See also 

Cylinder
Geometry
Solid geometry

References

Bibliography 

 Balestri, Rodrigo (2016). Matemática: interação e tecnologia (in Portuguese) (2 ed.). São Paulo: Leya.
 Conexões com a matemática (in Portuguese) (1 ed.). São Paulo: Moderna. 2010.
 Dolce, Osvaldo; Pompeo, José Nicolau (2013). Fundamentos da matemática elementar 9: geometria plana (in Portuguese) (9 ed.). São Paulo: Atual.
 Dolce, Osvaldo; Pompeo, José Nicolau (2005). Fundamentos da matemática elementar, 10: geometria espacial, posição e métrica (in Portuguese). São Paulo: Atual.
 Giovanni, José Ruy; Giovanni Jr., José Ruy; Bonjorno, José Roberto (2011). Matemática fundamental: uma nova abordagem (in Portuguese). São Paulo: FTD.
 Paiva, Manoel (2004). Matemática (in Portuguese) (1 ed.). São Paulo: Moderna.

Euclidean solid geometry
Geometry
Solids
Multi-dimensional geometry